Hong Nan-pa (April 10, 1897 or 1898 – August 30, 1941) was a Korean composer, violinist, conductor, music critic and educator. He is best known as the composer of Bongseonhwa (봉선화, literally Garden Balsam) written in 1919. It is generally considered as the first true Korean original song composed in Western style. It was widely sung during the period. Hong also contributed to developing Korean culture during the period with his diverse cultural activities.

Biography
Hong Nan-pa was born at Hwalcho Village of Namyang Township in present Hwangseong County, Gyeonggi on April 10, 1897. He was the second son to his father, Hong Sun (홍순) of the native Hong Clan to Namyoung (南陽) and his mother from Lee Clan of Jeonju, Jeolla. He had one brother and two sisters. Nan-pa is his ho, or pen name, but his given name is Hong Yeong-hu. His family moved to Seoul when he was still a young child. As he lived near the Ewha Academy (이화학당) located in the neighborhood of Jeong-dong, he attended Jeongdong Methodist Church and got access to hymn, a Western music.

He learned basic Confucian studies at a local seodang (a kind of elementary school) and entered a middle school in 1910 which was affiliated with the Hwangseong Young Men's Christian Association (황성기독교청년회, Korean YMCA). Since then, he had a violin and received music lessons. At the age of fifteen, Hong was admitted to the Western music department of Korean Court Music Study Institute (조선정악전습소 Joseon Jeongak Jeonseupso) that was the only music school in Korea at that time. He studied vocal music and violin from Kim In-sik (김인식). After the graduation, he was hired as an assistant teacher at the school.

In 1918, he went to Japan to enter Tokyo Music School in Ueno but returned to Korea to participate in the March 1st Movement as temporarily absent from the school. One year after the movement, he went back to Japan. However, Hong was rejected to continue his study at the school because of his involvement in the independent movement, so that he came back to Korea in despair. During his stay in Japan, he published the first Korean music magazine titled "Samgwang" (삼광, literally "Three Light"). After his return, he worked as a news report for Maeil Sinbunsa, and even attended Severance Medical School which became later the medical department of Yonsei University.

In April, 1920, Hong included the score of Aesu (애수, literally "sorrow"), a violin piece on the end pages of his short novel "Cheonyeohon" (lit. "a maiden's soul). He asked Kim Hyeong-jun for lyric for the tune whose song is "Bongseonhwa" (봉선화). In 1922, Hong made efforts to promote music while he participated in Yeongakhoe (연악회, Music Research Society) established by Gyeongsang Akuhoe (경상악우회 Gyeongsang Music Friend Society)'s lead. In 1925, he had the first solo violin recital as a Korean and published "Eumakgye" (음악계, Music World), the first music magazine published in Korea. Hong also wrote Eumakmanpil (음악만필, Music Essay) in Changjo. In 1926, as Hong entered Kunitachi College of Music as a transfer student, he was accepted to play first violin at Tokyo Symphony Orchestra (current NHK Symphony Orchestra). After graduation in 1929, he returned to Korea and published the first volume of "100 pieces of Joseon Children's song" (조선동요 100곡집) through Yeongakhoe.

Media

Popular culture
 Portrayed by Lee Ji-hoon in the 2018 SBS TV series The Hymn of Death.

See also
Ahn Eak-tai
Korean music
List of South Korean musicians
List of North Korean musicians

Footnotes

References

1890s births
1941 deaths
20th-century classical composers
Korea under Japanese rule
Korean classical musicians
Korean composers
Korean conductors (music)
Korean educators
Korean violinists
People from Gyeonggi Province
20th-century conductors (music)
Male classical composers
20th-century violinists
20th-century male musicians